Choephora is a genus of moths of the family Noctuidae.

Species
 Choephora fungorum Grote & Robinson, 1868

References
 Choephora at Markku Savela's Lepidoptera and Some Other Life Forms
 Natural History Museum Lepidoptera genus database

Noctuinae